A gypsum cave is a natural karstic formation in gypsum. Gypsum karst is very rare. It depends on deposits of gypsum or anhydrite, often also called alabaster. Chemically it is calcium sulfate, CaSO4.

Gypsum caves can be found in several places on earth, including:
Optymistychna Cave in Ukraine, considered the longest gypsum cave at 232 km
Orda Cave underneath the Western Ural Mountains, with 5.1km length, including 4.8km underwater
Cuevas de Sorbas in Almeria, Spain

Caves noted for large scale gypsum speleothems include:
Cave of the Crystals in Chihuahua, Mexico
Lechuguilla Cave in New Mexico, US

References

Related pages
Gypsum
Karst

External links
World's longest gypsum caves compiled

Gypsum caves
Landforms
Geomorphology